The Eviation Alice is an electric aircraft designed to accommodate nine passengers and two crew members. Currently under development, its construction incorporates 95% composite material, is powered by two electric motors, and has a T-tail. The prototype first flew on 27 September 2022.

Development 

Eviation was founded in 2015 by Omer Bar-Yohay, Omri Regev and Aviv Tzidon. Risk-sharing partnerships have enabled work to go ahead.

In February 2018, a  scale model UAV was flown to validate the aerodynamics and flight controls. Kokam was selected to supply pouch lithium polymer batteries to power the full-scale prototype. Work on the power system and drive train was begun.

Eviation teamed up with Embry-Riddle Aeronautical University to launch a research and development program in the spring of 2019 at its Prescott, Arizona campus. The program would focus on performance analysis, validation and testing, along with preliminary design and sub-scale testing of future electric propulsion and airframe design concepts.

By early 2019, Eviation had secured $200 million of investment to cover certification and production while the first prototype was assembled in Vannes, northwest France. In April 2019, Eviation selected MagniX Magni250s 375 shp (280 kW) electric motors turning at 1,900 rpm as an alternative power option to Siemens 260 kW motors.

At the June 2019 Paris Air Show, a full-size static Alice was exhibited.

The first airline customer was announced: Hyannis, Massachusetts-based Cape Air. Cape Air ordered 92 aircraft, priced at $4 million each. MagniX investor Clermont Group from Singapore took a 70% stake in Eviation Aircraft in August 2019. By October 2019, over 150 Alice aircraft had been ordered by two American companies. Further investment of $500 million was still needed to begin serial production.

On 22 January 2020, a fire broke out and the prototype was destroyed, but no-one was injured. The fire broke out in an under-floor battery compartment located in the "operator/passenger area".

On 18 May 2020, GKN Aerospace announced their partnership with Eviation on the design and manufacture of the wing, empennage and electrical wiring interconnection system of subsequent Alice airframes.

New configuration 
By December 2020, Eviation expected to fly a modified Alice design in 2021, with the wing-tip motors relocated, before certification in the second half of 2023.

In July 2021, Eviation unveiled the updated configuration with a T-tail and two 850 hp (634 kW) Magni650 electric powerplants on each side of the aft fuselage, aiming for a first flight the same year.
It should cruise at 220 kn (407 km/h, down from 240 kn), have 440 nmi range, 100 nmi (185 km) less than previously, be powered by an 820 kWh lithium-ion battery weighing 3,720 kg (8,200 lb), down from a 920 kWh battery weighing 3,600 kg, would have a 6,350 kg maximum take-off weight, down from 6,668 kg, an altitude ceiling of 32,000 ft and a maximum payload of 1,134 kg.

Taxi testing of the first production model began in December 2021 at Arlington Municipal Airport, north of Seattle. In June 2022, it was announced that the prototype Alice was being moved to Moses Lake in Washington State, where first flight was hoped to occur by the summer of 2022.

The aircraft had its first flight on 27 September 2022.
Following the first test flight, Eviation announced it has revised the proposed range from 440 nm to 250 nm. The projected service entry date has been delayed to 2027.
Before this range reduction, endurance at MTOW was planned at 2.8h.

Design 
Two variants of the Alice were originally planned.
The initial, unpressurized model is intended for air taxi operations, with energy stored in a lithium-ion battery. Eviation was working on building a prototype scheduled to fly in early 2019.
In October 2019, Eviation described only the pressurized Alice Commuter with a  cruise speed.

This is anticipated to increase as battery technology improves.
The batteries have been tested to more than 1,000 cycles, equivalent to 3,000 flight hours, and will then require replacement at a cost of $250,000 - half of the direct operating cost, similar to a piston engine overhaul.
45% of air routes fall within its 565 nmi (1,050 km) range at 260 kn (482 km/h), or 55% of airline flights according to Flightglobal's Cirium data.

The electric drivetrain will have a higher voltage than current electrical systems. Two  Magni650 electric motors will drive two propellers mounted on the aft fuselage.
The unpressurized aircraft has a flat lower fuselage. The Italian company Magnaghi Aeronautica supplies landing gear and has already produced the gear for the similarly sized Piaggio P.180 Avanti.
It will be built with existing technology, including a composite airframe, propulsion from two Magnix electric engines and Honeywell's flight control systems, including automatic landing.
At 3,700 kg (8,200 lb), the batteries account for 60% of the aircraft take-off weight. Manufacturing is planned in the US.

The company plans for recharging to be carried out by mobile charging vehicles, similar to aviation fuel trucks. Each hour of flight time is expected to require a charging time of 30 minutes.
The cells are similar to those from auto industry batteries.

Orders 
The first buyer for the Alice was Cape Air, a regional airline serving the Northeastern United States as well as the Caribbean. In August 2021, Deutsche Post announced that it had ordered 12 aircraft for use by DHL to transport cargo, with delivery planned from 2024.
In April 2022, Eviation stated that Cape Air ordered 75 planes.
In September 2022, GlobalX Airlines ordered 50 aircraft, with deliveries starting in 2027. In January 2023, Mexican start-up carrier Aerus ordered 30 aircraft.

Specifications (intended)

See also 
 List of electric aircraft
 Tecnam P-Volt
 Zunum Aero

References

External links 

 

Israeli business aircraft
Electric aircraft
Proposed aircraft of Israel